Abysmal Thoughts is the fourth studio album by New York City surf rock band The Drums. The album was released on June 16, 2017, through ANTI-.

The album was preceded by the single, "Blood Under My Belt."

Track listing

Charts

Personnel 
 Producer/Musician: Jonathan Pierce
 Engineer/Mixer: Jonathan Schenke
 Mastering: Joe LaPorta
 Management: Andrew Mishko

References 

2017 albums
The Drums albums
Anti- (record label) albums